is a Japanese former professional basketball player who last played for the Hiroshima Dragonflies of the B.League in Japan. He was selected by the Yokohama B-Corsairs with the first overall pick in the 2011 bj League draft.

References

1983 births
Living people
Hiroshima Dragonflies players
Japanese men's basketball players
Utsunomiya Brex players
Otsuka Corporation Alphas players
People from Yokohama
Point guards
Sportspeople from Kanagawa Prefecture
Yokohama B-Corsairs coaches
Yokohama B-Corsairs players